The Dominican Republic national tennis team represents the Dominican Republic in Davis Cup tennis competition and are governed by the Federación Dominicana de Tenis.

The Dominican Republic currently compete in the Americas Zone of Group I.

History
The Dominican Republic competed in its first Davis Cup in 1989.

In 2010, the Dominican Republic reached Americas Zone Group I for the first time.

The country once again reached Americas Zone Group I in 2012 after defeating Mexico in the final, with a 3-2 result.

In September, 2013, the Dominican Republic maintained its Americas Zone Group I status after beating Chile 4-1 in the relegation play-off.

In July, 2015, the team defeated Ecuador, and for the first time will face World Group play-offs against Germany on home soil.

Current Team (2022) 

 Nick Hardt
 Peter Bertran
 Víctor Estrella Burgos (Doubles player)
 Juan Berrido-Fernández (Captain-player)

See also
Davis Cup
Dominican Republic Fed Cup team

External links

Davis Cup teams
Davis Cup
Davis Cup